Charles Andrews (February 11, 1814 – April 30, 1852) was a United States representative from Maine.  He was born in Paris, Massachusetts (now in Maine) on February 11, 1814.  He attended the district school and graduated from Hebron Academy.

He studied law, and was admitted to the bar in 1837.  He commenced practice in Turner, Maine before returning to Paris.  He was elected as a  member of the Maine House of Representatives 1839–1843, serving as speaker in 1842.  He became clerk of the courts for Oxford County, Maine on January 1, 1845, serving three years.  He was elected as a delegate to the Democratic National Convention in Baltimore in 1848.

He was elected as a Democrat to the Thirty-second Congress and served from March 4, 1851, until his death in Paris on April 30, 1852.  Interment is in Hillside Cemetery.

See also
List of United States Congress members who died in office (1790–1899)

References

1814 births
1852 deaths
People from Paris, Maine
People from Turner, Maine
Speakers of the Maine House of Representatives
County officials in Maine
Democratic Party members of the United States House of Representatives from Maine
19th-century American politicians